Ivan Šunjić (born 9 October 1996) is a Croatian professional footballer who plays as a defensive midfielder for Bundesliga club Hertha BSC, on loan from  club Birmingham City. He previously played for Lokomotiva and Dinamo Zagreb. Internationally, he was a regular in Croatia's youth teams from under-16 through to under-21 level, and was capped once for the senior team in 2017.

Club career
Born in Zenica, Bosnia and Herzegovina, Šunjić made his professional debut with Dinamo Zagreb in the 2013–14 season.

Lokomotiva Zagreb
After appearing only for the reserves, he joined Lokomotiva on 10 February 2016. On 13 May 2017, he scored his first goal for the club in the dying minutes of a 2–0 league victory over Inter Zaprešić.
Ahead of the 2017–18 season, Šunjić was made the club captain. On 15 September, he scored the winning goal in the final minutes of a 1–0 league victory against Cibalia.

On 12 February 2018, Šunjić rejoined Dinamo Zagreb and signed a contract until 15 June 2023. However, at the same time, he was loaned to Lokomotiva for the rest of the season.

Dinamo Zagreb
He returned to Dinamo Zagreb for the 2018–19 season and featured 41 times in all competitions. He made 8 appearances in the Europa League, scoring in a 4–1 win over Fenerbahçe on 20 September 2018 and starting in Dinamo Zagreb's impressive 1–0 first leg win against Benfica in the round of 16 of the Europa League on 7 March. He was suspended for the second leg, in which Dinamo Zagreb were eliminated. Šunjić made 30 league appearances as Dinamo Zagreb finished as champions, and scored a 90th-minute goal in the Croatian Cup semifinal against Osijek that secured a 2–0 win. He started in the final, which Dinamo Zagreb lost 3–1 to Rijeka.

Birmingham City
On 26 July 2019, Šunjić signed a five-year contract with Birmingham City of the English Championship. The officially undisclosed fee was reported as €7 million. He made his debut as a second-half substitute in Birmingham's opening fixture of the season, a 1–0 win away against Brentford on 3 August 2019. His "rasping rising 20-yard shot which flew into the net" to tie the scores away to Derby County won him the Championship Goal of the Month award for October, but Birmingham lost the match. Three months into the season, the Birmingham Mail rated his performance at 9/10, describing him as "imposing and dynamic" and suggesting that "the destructive side of his game [had] gone up a level", Interviewed during the first COVID-19 lockdown, Šunjić felt satisfied by his season thus far, despite dips in form which he felt inevitable in a "fast, physical league" with many games, but admitted there were areas in which he could improve. He finished the season with 44 appearances (40 starts).

Hertha Berlin loan
Šunjić joined Bundesliga club Hertha Berlin on loan for the 2022–23 season.

International career
Šunjić was included in Croatia's squad for the 2013 Under-17 World Cup, and played all three group matches.

Šunjić was called up to the senior national team for a friendly match against Mexico in the United States on 28 May. He played the whole of the match, in which an inexperienced Croatia team comprising largely debutants and reduced to ten men secured a 2–1 victory against a relatively strong Mexican side.

He captained Croatia at the 2019 UEFA European Under-21 Championships and played all three of their matches.

Career statistics

Club

International

Honours 
Dinamo Zagreb
 Prva HNL: 2013–14, 2018–19

References

External links
 

1996 births
Living people
Sportspeople from Zenica
Croats of Bosnia and Herzegovina
Association football midfielders
Croatian footballers
Croatia youth international footballers
Croatia under-21 international footballers
Croatia international footballers
GNK Dinamo Zagreb players
GNK Dinamo Zagreb II players
NK Lokomotiva Zagreb players
Birmingham City F.C. players
Hertha BSC players
Croatian Football League players
First Football League (Croatia) players
English Football League players
Bundesliga players
Croatian expatriate footballers
Expatriate footballers in England
Expatriate footballers in Germany
Croatian expatriate sportspeople in England
Croatian expatriate sportspeople in Germany